Puerto Lápice is a municipality of Spain located in the province of Ciudad Real, Castilla–La Mancha. The municipality spans across a total area of 54.84 km2 and, as of 1 January 2020, it has a registered population of 891.

Already since the 13th century, the territory of Puerto Lápice was part of the Campo de San Juan, the extensive territory under the seigneurial jurisdiction of the Knights Hospitaller in the lands of La Mancha.

References

Municipalities in the Province of Ciudad Real